Qeshlaq Dasht District is in Bileh Savar County, Ardabil province, Iran. At the 2006 census, its population was 24,685 in 5,262 households. The following census in 2011 counted 22,848 people in 5,948 households. At the latest census in 2016, the district had 22,146 inhabitants living in 6,348 households.

References 

Bileh Savar County

Districts of Ardabil Province

Populated places in Ardabil Province

Populated places in Bileh Savar County